Steffi Graf was the defending champion but did not compete that year.

Martina Navratilova won in the final 6–1, 4–6, 6–4 against Gabriela Sabatini.

Seeds
A champion seed is indicated in bold text while text in italics indicates the round in which that seed was eliminated. The top eight seeds received a bye to the second round.

  Martina Navratilova (champion)
  Gabriela Sabatini (final)
  Manuela Maleeva (semifinals)
  Claudia Kohde-Kilsch (third round)
  Lori McNeil (quarterfinals)
  Zina Garrison (semifinals)
 n/a - Mary Joe Fernandez, originally seeded seventh, withdrew from the tournament with a fever.
  Raffaella Reggi (quarterfinals)
  Sylvia Hanika (quarterfinals)
  Sandra Cecchini (third round)
  Isabel Cueto (first round)
  Jana Novotná (second round)
  Judith Wiesner (second round)
  Helen Kelesi (quarterfinals)
 n/a
 n/a

Draw

Finals

Top half

Section 1

Section 2

Bottom half

Section 3

Section 4

References

External links
 ITF tournament edition details

1988 Singles
1988 WTA Tour